The long-tailed tit (Aegithalos caudatus), also named long-tailed bushtit, is a common bird found throughout Europe and the Palearctic. The genus name Aegithalos was a term used by Aristotle for some European tits, including the long-tailed tit.

Taxonomy and systematics
The long-tailed tit was formally described by the Swedish naturalist Carl Linnaeus in 1758 in the tenth edition of his Systema Naturae under the binomial name Parus caudatus.  The specific epithet caudatus is the Latin word for "tailed". Linnaeus did not invent this Latin name. "Parus caudatus" had been used by earlier authors such as the Swiss naturalist Conrad Gessner in 1555, the Italian naturalist Ulisse Aldrovandi in 1599, and the English ornithologist Francis Willughby in 1676. Willughby listed the English name as the "long tail'd titmouse". Its previous common nickname in everyday English was the bum-towel, from the shape of its tail.

The long-tailed tit was first classified as a true tit of the Parus group. Parus has since been split from the Aegithalidae, with the latter becoming a distinct family containing three genera:

 Aegithalos (long-tailed tits), five species including A. caudatus
 Psaltria (pygmy bushtit), monotypic
 Psaltriparus (American bushtit), monotypic.

This is the only representative of the Aegithalidae in northern Eurasia. The long-tailed tit exhibits complex global variation with 17 races recognised, divisible into three groups:

the A. c. caudatus group in northern Europe and Asia. A. c. caudatus has a pure white head
the A. c. europaeus group in southern and western Europe, north-east China, and Japan. Separating A. c. rosaceus from other members of the A. c. europaeus group though is problematic, relying on varying thickness of the crown stripes and amount of streaks and colour on the underparts
the A. c. alpinus group in Mediterranean Europe and south-west Asia.

The silver-throated bushtit (Aegithalos glaucogularis) from eastern China was formerly considered conspecific but the plumage is distinctive and there are significant genetic differences.

Where the groups meet there are extensive areas occupied by very variable ‘hybrids’. The British long-tailed tit, subspecies A. c. rosaceus, belongs to the A. c. europaeus group.

Description
This species has been described as a tiny (at only  in length, including its  tail), round-bodied tit with a short, stubby bill and a very long, narrow tail. The sexes look the same and young birds undergo a complete moult to adult plumage before the first winter. The plumage is mainly black and white, with variable amounts of grey and pink.

Voice
Vocalisations are a valuable aid to locating and identifying these birds. When in flocks they issue constant contact calls and are often heard before they are seen. They have three main calls, a single high pitched pit, a ‘triple trill’ eez-eez-eez, and a rattling schnuur. The calls become faster and louder when the birds cross open ground or if an individual becomes separated from the group.

Distribution and habitat
The long-tailed tit is globally widespread throughout temperate northern Europe and the Palearctic, into boreal Scandinavia and south into the Mediterranean zone. It inhabits deciduous and mixed woodland with a well-developed shrub layer, favouring edge habitats. It can also be found in scrub, heathland with scattered trees, bushes and hedges, in farmland and riverine woodland, parks and gardens. The bird's year-round diet of insects and social foraging bias habitat choice in winter towards deciduous woodland, typically of oak, ash and locally sycamore species. For nesting, strong preference is shown towards scrub areas.

Behaviour and ecology

Food and feeding
The long-tailed tit is insectivorous throughout the year. It eats predominantly arthropods, preferring the eggs and larvae of moths and butterflies. Occasional vegetable matter (such as seeds) is taken in the autumn.

Nest
The nest of the long-tailed tit is constructed from four materials: lichen, feathers, spider egg cocoons and moss, with over 6,000 pieces used for a typical nest. The nest is a flexible sac with a small, round entrance at the top, suspended either low in a gorse or bramble bush or high up in the forks of tree branches. The structural stability of the nest is provided by a mesh of moss and spider silk; the tiny leaves of the moss act as hooks and the spider's silken thread provides the loops, thus producing a natural form of velcro. The tit lines the outside with hundreds of flakes of pale lichens to provide camouflage. The inside of the nest is lined with more than 2,000 downy feathers to provide insulation. The nests suffer a high rate of predation, with only 17% success.

Social behaviour

Extensive work has been done at Wytham Wood, Oxfordshire, in Germany and Japan.

Outside the breeding season they form compact flocks of six to seventeen birds, composed of family parties (parents and offspring) from the previous breeding season, together with any extra adults that helped to raise a brood. These flocks will occupy and defend territories against neighbouring flocks. The driving force behind the flocking behaviour is thought to be that of winter roosting, being susceptible to cold; huddling increases survival through cold nights.

From July to February, the non-breeding season, long-tailed tits form flocks of relatives and non-relatives, roosting communally. When the breeding season begins, the flocks break up, and the birds attempt to breed in monogamous pairs. Males remain within the winter territory, while females have a tendency to wander to neighbouring territories.

Pairs whose nests fail have three choices: try again, abandon nesting for the season or help at a neighbouring nest. It has been shown that failed pairs split and help at the nests of male relatives, recognition being established vocally. The helped nests have greater success due to higher provisioning rates and better nest defence. At the end of the breeding season, in June and July, the birds reform the winter flocks in their winter territory.

Helpers
Due to high predation, there is a high nest failure rate. If nest failure occurs after the beginning of May, failed breeders will not try to re-nest, but may become helpers at a nest of another, usually related, pair. In one study, around 50% of nests had one or more helpers. By helping close relatives, helpers gain indirect fitness benefits by increasing the survivability of related offspring. Helpers may also gain greater access to mates and territories in the future. Helpers also gain experience raising young and therefore their future offspring have greater survivability rates.

Males and females are equally likely to become helpers. Parents may allow the care of helpers to be additive to their own efforts, or on the other extreme, they may reduce their efforts with the care of the helpers. Juvenile males have a higher survivability than juvenile females, although the survival rate for adults of the two sexes is the same. Offspring that were raised with helpers have a higher survivability than offspring raised without. Failed breeders that became helpers have a higher survivability than failed breeders who did not. This may be because of the reduced energy expenditure from sharing a nest. This is similar to acorn woodpeckers and green wood hoopoes. However, failed breeders that did not help are more likely to breed successfully in subsequent years, so there may be a cost of helping. This may be due to helpers having relatively poorer body conditions at the end of the breeding season, similar to pied kingfisher and white-winged chough. Successful breeders have a survivability rate around the survivability of failed breeders who became helpers.

Status and conservation
Globally, the species is common throughout its range, only becoming scarce at the edge of the distribution. The IUCN, BirdLife International and The British Trust for Ornithology (BTO) all list the long-tailed tit as a ‘species of least concern’, currently under little or no threat and reasonably abundant.

Due to their small size they are vulnerable to extreme cold weather, with population losses of up to 80% being recorded in times of prolonged cold. It is thought that populations rapidly return to previous levels due to high breeding potential.

Gallery

References

Sources

External links

 Xeno-canto: audio recordings of the long-tailed tit
 Long-tailed tit videos, photos & sounds on the Internet Bird Collection
 Calls of several long-tailed tits—a British Library sound recording.
 "Ageing and sexing" (PDF; 1.48 MB) by Javier Blasco-Zumeta & Gerd-Michael Heinze

long-tailed tit
long-tailed tit
Birds of Europe
Birds of Japan
Birds of Korea
Birds of Russia
Birds of Western Asia
Taxa named by Carl Linnaeus